The 2018 Blackburn with Darwen Borough Council election took place on 3 May 2018 to elect members of Blackburn with Darwen Borough Council in England. This was the same day as other local elections.

Election Result

!colspan=2|Total!!51

Council Composition
Prior to the election the composition of the council was:

LD - Liberal Democrat

I - Independent

After the election, the composition of the council was:

LD - Liberal Democrat

Ward results 

All results are listed below:

Audley & Queen's Park

Bastwell & Daisyfield

Billinge & Beardwood

Blackburn Central

Blackburn South & Lower Darwen

Blackburn South East

Darwen East

Darwen South

Darwen West

Ewood

Little Harwood & Whitebirk

Livesey with Pleasington

Mill Hill & Moorgate

Roe Lee

Shear Brow & Corporation Park

Wensley Fold

West Pennine

References 

2018 English local elections
2018
2010s in Lancashire